The 2020–21 Western Kentucky Lady Toppers basketball team represents Western Kentucky University during the 2020–21 NCAA Division I women's basketball season. The team is led by third-year head coach Greg Collins, and plays their home games at the E. A. Diddle Arena in Bowling Green, Kentucky as a member of Conference USA.

Schedule and results

|-
!colspan=12 style=|Non-conference regular season

|-
!colspan=12 style=|CUSA regular season

|-
!colspan=12 style=| CUSA Tournament

See also
 2020–21 Western Kentucky Hilltoppers basketball team

Notes

References

Western Kentucky Lady Toppers basketball seasons
Western Kentucky Lady Toppers
Western Kentucky Lady Toppers basketball team
Western Kentucky Lady Toppers basketball team